Muhammad Shah was son of Sultan Feroze Shah Tughluq and was ruler of the Muslim Tughlaq dynasty.

Life 
When Sultan Abu Bakr Shah Tughluq became ruler of the Tughlaq dynasty of the Delhi Sultanate, Muhammad Shah as his uncle was opposed to him, and struggled against Abu Bakr over the control of the throne. In August 1390, he launched an attack on Delhi and battled Abu Bakr Khan for the throne of Delhi. Eventually Abu Bakr was defeated, and Muhammad Shah succeeded him as king, reigning from 1390 to 1394. After Abu Bakr's defeat, Muhammad Shah imprisoned him in the fort of Meerut where he died soon after. Muhammad Shah ruled the Delhi Sultanate for four years before his death on 20 January 1394.

References

See also 

 Delhi Sultanate

Tughluq sultans
14th-century Indian Muslims
14th-century Indian monarchs